Sushil Barman is an Indian politician from BJP. In May 2021, he was elected as the member of the West Bengal Legislative Assembly from Mathabhanga.

Career
Barman is from Ghoksadanga, Mathabhanga, Cooch Behar district. His father's name is Keshari Mohan Barman. He passed H.S. Pass From Mathabhanga College, in 1988. He contested in 2021 West Bengal Legislative Assembly election from Mathabhanga Vidhan Sabha and won the seat on 2 May 2021.

References

Living people
Year of birth missing (living people)
21st-century Indian politicians
People from Cooch Behar district
Bharatiya Janata Party politicians from West Bengal
West Bengal MLAs 2021–2026